= Mathihalli =

Coordinates: 14.7677°N 76.1365°E

- village
- Interactive map of Mathihalli
- Country: India
- State: Karnataka

Government
  - Type: Panchayat raj
  - Body: Gram panchayat

Languages
  - Official: Kannada
- Time zone: UTC+5:30 (IST)
- Postal code: 583127
- ISO 3166 code: IN-KA
- Vehicle registration: KA 17
- Website: karnataka.gov.in

Mathihalli is a village about 100 kilometres from Bellary in Karnataka, India. The village is ancient but still exists with a small population but little infrastructure.
